This is a list of television episodes from the British television show Press Gang. Press Gang was produced by Richmond Film & Television for Central, and screened on the ITV network in its regular weekday afternoon children's strand, Children's ITV. All 43 episodes across five series were written by Steven Moffat. The first episode was transmitted on 16 January 1989, and the final transmitted on 21 May 1993. The show gained an adult audience in an early evening slot when repeated on Sundays on Channel 4.

The show was based on the activities of the staff of the Junior Gazette, a children's newspaper initially produced by pupils from the local comprehensive school. The main story arc was the on-off romance between the newspaper's editor Lynda Day (Julia Sawalha) and Spike Thomson (Dexter Fletcher). The other main characters were assistant editor Kenny Phillips (Lee Ross), Sarah Jackson (Kelda Holmes), the paper's enterprising accountant Colin Mathews (Paul Reynolds) and Frazz Davies (Mmoloki Chrystie).

In June 2007, The Stage reported that Moffat and Sawalha are interested in reviving Press Gang. He said: "I would revive that like a shot. I would love to do a reunion episode—a grown-up version. I know Julia Sawalha is interested—every time I see her she asks me when we are going to do it. Maybe it will happen—I would like it to."

Series overview

Episodes

Series 1 (1989)
Most of the episodes in the first and second series had closing voice-overs featuring typically two characters. These are noted with each episode synopsis. The voice-overs were dropped for the third series onwards, as Moffat felt they were not working as well any more. Producer Sandra C. Hastie recalls that Moffat was "extremely angry" that Drop the Dead Donkey had adopted the style.

The first series established the characters and the style of the series. The first two episodes were directed by Colin Nutley. However, he was unhappy with the final edit and requested that his name be removed from the credits. Bob Spiers, who writer Moffat credits as setting the visual style, made his Press Gang directorial debut with "One Easy Lesson".

The show addressed its first serious issue in the two part story "How to Make a Killing", in which the team expose shopkeepers who sell solvents to underage customers. The penultimate episode, "Monday-Tuesday", sees a character commit suicide after being rejected from the writing team and told some home truths by Lynda. However, the series also features many comedic elements, some of which are referred to in later years. Colin's inadvertent attendance at a funeral dressed as a pink rabbit in "A Night In" is referenced in "Something Terrible: Part 2".

Series 2 (1990)
Moffat was impressed with Lucy Benjamin's performance as Julie, and expanded her character for the second series. However she had committed herself to roles in the LWT sitcom Close to Home and Jupiter Moon, so the character was replaced by Sam Black (Gabrielle Anwar). The replacement occurred so close to the start of production that Sam was basically the character of Julie under a different name, especially in her earlier
episodes.

{{Episode table |background=3B97FF |overall=5 |series=5 |title=22 |director=20 |writer=20 |airdate=18  |episodes=

       {{Episode list

| Title = Something Terrible (Part 2) | DirectedBy = Bob Spiers | OriginalAirDate =  | EpisodeNumber = 20
| EpisodeNumber2 = 8
| WrittenBy = Steven Moffat
| ShortSummary = Colin tries helplessly to do something to stop Cindy's father from sexually abusing her, but his efforts come to nothing with everyone thinking he is just up to his latest scheme, until Lynda of all people offers to help, producing a special edition of the Junior Gazette dealing with child abuse.

Writer Moffat says that Press Gang'''s issue-led episodes served to develop the main characters, so that "Something Terrible" is more "about Colin's redemption [from selfish capitalist], rather than Cindy's abuse."

| LineColor = 3B97FF }}     {{Episode list

| Title = The Big Finish? | DirectedBy = Bob Spiers | OriginalAirDate =  | EpisodeNumber = 25
| EpisodeNumber2 = 13
| WrittenBy = Steven Moffat
| ShortSummary = When Brian Magboy (Simon Schatzberger) arrives with news that the team could be replaced, it looks as if things may never be the same again at the Junior Gazette. Things are set to come to a head on the day of Kenny's big concert lined up, Spike is set to return to America unless Lynda tells him that she loves him, and Lynda awaits news about the Junior Gazette's future.
| LineColor = 3B97FF
}}
}}

Series 3 (1991)
The Junior Gazette is now running commercially, although still under the main Gazette and still having to answer to Matt Kerr. Paul Cornell praises the continuity in this series, beginning with Lynda hiccuping in "The Big Hello", a reference to "At Last a Dragon". The same actress (Aisling Flitton) who played a wrong number in "Love and the Junior Gazette" reprised her character for "Chance is a Fine Thing". "Attention to detail" such as this is, according to Cornell, "one of the numerous ways that the series respects the intelligence of its viewers."

Series 4 (1992)
Series three and four were filmed together as one block. However, Lee Ross, who played Kenny, was unable to commit to the second half of the block. Therefore, Kenny has left for Australia.

Cornell remarks that this series is a "strange beast, somewhat cynical, with a tired acceptance of growing up that produced more pain in the drama than previously." It opens with a funeral, and later features the death of one of the central characters' father.

Series 5 (1993)
A television film called "Deadline" was planned. It was set a few years after the series and aimed at a more adult audience. At one stage in 1992, series 4 was intended to be the last, and the movie was proposed as a follow-up. However, making of the film fell through when a fifth series was commissioned instead. The idea of the follow-up film was reconsidered several times during the 1990s, but fell through every time for various reasons.

Home release
All episodes were released on DVD between 2004 and 2006. Network released the series in the UK between 2004 and 2005, and Force Entertainment released it in Australia between 2005 and 2006. Each series was released periodically, culminating in a complete boxed set. The main difference in the packaging of each series was the varying colours of the Press Gang'' logo, which matched the disc menu.

References

General

 Paul Cornell (1993) "Press Gang" In:

Specific

External links
 
 Press Gang at itv.com
 Synopses based on the Press Gang Original Series Guide by Adrian Petford
 Matthew Newton's episode guide 

Lists of British children's television series episodes
Lists of British comedy-drama television series episodes
Lists of British teen comedy television series episodes
Lists of British teen drama television series episodes
Television episodes written by Steven Moffat